Soldati - 365 all'alba (i.e. "Soldiers 365 Days Before Discharge") is a 1987 Italian drama film directed by Marco Risi. The film, which deals with the military service seen as a traumatic experience, marked the switch of Risi from low-wattage comedies to more complex themes.

Before coming into production, the screenplay was submitted to the Ministry of Defence to obtain the necessary permits to shoot in real barracks, but it received an outright refusal, as the Ministry feared to exacerbate the already harsh controversy that at the time had invested the Army because of a chain of suicides in the barracks as a result of hazing. The film, therefore, was filmed partly in Rome between the Empire Studios, the private school Nazarene College and the psychiatric hospital Santa Maria della Pietà, and Trieste, in the museum of national history.

Plot
The year is 1987. In a barracks in Pontebba, various young people who differ from each other in character, ways of life and social background are gathered for military service. To target the recruits are first the older soldiers (the nonni), then lieutenant Fili, who shows particular dislike for private Scanna. The officer vents on the soldier his existential dissatisfaction, the disappointment for a lack of promotion, the morbid jealousy for his wife Anna. But despite the harassment, the dismissal is approaching. On the very last night, the young soldiers, fully armed, are called for a strange exercise and leave by plane to an unknown destination.

Cast 
Claudio Amendola: Claudio Scanna 
Massimo Dapporto: Lieutenant Armando Fili
Ivo Garrani: Colonel 
Claudio Botosso: Adalberto Romani  
Alessandro Benvenuti: Buzzi
Agostina Belli: Anna Fili
Manlio Dovì: Salvatore Sciaffa
Pietro Ghislandi: Dario Del Grillo 
Antonella Ponziani: Annina 
Sandro Ghiani: Corporal Porcu
Ugo Conti: Sergeant Gallo

References

External links

1987 films
Italian drama films
1987 drama films
Films directed by Marco Risi
Films scored by Manuel De Sica
1980s Italian films